Lord Charles Murray-Aynsley (21 October 1771 – 5 May 1808) was an English dean.

Life
Murray-Aynsley was the youngest of nine children of John Murray, 3rd Duke of Atholl, and Charlotte Murray, Duchess of Atholl, and baptized as Charles Murray. On 18 June 1793 he married Alicia Mitford (1768–1813), daughter of George Mitford, and heiress of her great-uncle, Gawen Aynsley, Esq. Upon the marriage, he assumed the surname Aynsley.

In 1803 Murray-Aynsley was made Dean of Bocking, in Essex, where he entertained King Louis XVIII of France and his suite. The Very Revd Philip Need, Dean of Bocking, described the visit as follows:

In the Year 1808 the exiled French King Louis 18th, living nearby at Gosfield Hall, was entertained by Dean Charles Murray-Aynsley at Bocking Deanery, all the parish taking part in the fun and celebrations. A job was found for everyone in the village so that they could share in the royal celebration. On the day in question it snowed heavily, so some people had the honour of clearing the snow for the King's procession.

He was also the incumbent at Kirk Andreas and technically Archdeacon of Man.

Family
Lord Charles and his wife had seven children:

Charlotte Murray-Aynsley (8 April 1794 – 22 February 1827), married Sir John Oswald on 28 January 1812
John Murray-Aynsley (2 June 1795 – 25 March 1870), married Emma Sara Peach on 24 June 1820 and had issue, including Hugh Murray-Aynsley.
Charles Collingwood Murray-Aynsley (1796–1797)
George Edward Murray-Aynsley (b. 1798), died young
Athole Keturah Murray-Aynsley (22 July 1801 – 26 January 1844), married Sir Herbert Oakeley, 3rd Baronet on 5 June 1826
Elizabeth Anne Murray-Aynsley (30 October 1802 – 7 June 1880)
Charles Edward Murray-Aynsley (December 1805 – August 1815)

References 

 ThePeerage entry
 Maximilian Genealogy entry
 Address by Very Revd Philip Need, Dean of Bocking, following the Friends of Essex Churches Trust AGM – 14 May 2009

1771 births
1808 deaths
Church of England deans
Archdeacons of Man
Younger sons of dukes
Charles
Deans of Bocking